CDAI may refer to:

Crohn's Disease Activity Index
Cartilage-derived angiogenesis inhibitor